Sounds Like Armageddon is a live album by the American heavy metal band Otep. It was released on November 6, 2012, on Victory Records. The album closes with Otep thanking the audience and Kurt Cobain, and then playing the cover of Nirvana's song "Breed".

Track listing

Personnel

Otep
 Otep Shamaya - vocals
 Ari Mihalopoulos - guitar
 Erik Tisinger - bass
 Chase Brickenden - drums

Production
 FOH/Sound Engineer - Tristan Wallace
 Executive Producer - Otep Shamaya
 Mastering - Alan Douches
 Art Direction - Otep Shamaya
 Artwork - Mike C. Hardcore
 Inside Otep Illustration - Joey James
 Layout - Jason Link

References

2012 live albums
Otep albums
Victory Records live albums